Shore Action is a political ticket which contests the boards and council seats in the North Shore Ward of the Auckland Council. They have a strong focus on retention of local assets and investment in the natural environment, along with a focus on local participation in local body politics.

Grant Gillon, a former Alliance Party MP, and AUT lecturer, along with Anne-Elise Smithson, a Community Development Coordinator for the Children's Autism Foundation, contested the North Shore Ward seat on the Auckland City Council. The wider team contested the local boards on the North Shore Ward.

While neither Gillon nor Smithson won a council seat for the ward, Shore Action did win seats on the Devonport-Takapuna and Kaipātiki Local Boards, and the Birkenhead Licensing Trust.

Policies 
Shore Action fought to retain the Takapuna Beach Holiday Park, opposing plans for a hard stand on the reserve. They also wish to save the Anzac St Carpark (currently home of the Takapuna Sunday Markets).

They wish to invest in various environmental services by increasing volunteer networks, which they believe will aid in pest eradication and the reduction of pollution in urban streams and coastal areas. Smithson made the environment her central campaign platform and has stated: “Our streams, bush and wildlife are struggling and our unique North Shore environment needs protecting as our city grows. Healthy ecosystems help our communities flourish".

In July 2018 Shore Action announced a significant funding boost for Kaipātiki environmental initiatives - securing $400,000 of funding for the 2018/19 financial year - a 38% increase towards environmental initiatives compared to the previous financial year. This increase would support clean streams, pest-free reserves, urban canopy protection, an open space management plan and a Kauri Dieback Strategy for Kaipātiki. Says Smithson: “Two-thirds of Auckland’s native species are threatened with extinction and kauri could die out completely in the next 30 years. The time to act is now.” 

In August 2019, Shore Action announced that the Kaipātiki Local Board had managed to secure 47% of the total Auckland-wide kauri budget to be spent in the Kaipātiki area. This would go towards upgrading bush tracks in kauri forest, and installing cleaning stations at track entrances.

Throughout the instrumentation of their policies, Shore Action aims to keep their voters and ratepayers adequately informed. They also have a focus on better public transport, advocating for easing congestion on Lake Road as well as highlighting a need for heritage protection.

Shore Action advocated for shade sails to be put up over all playgrounds in the area; the protection from the sun would allow the playgrounds to last longer and prevent the risk of skin cancer in children.

Elected representatives

Current representatives 
Shore Action holds seats on the Devonport-Takapuna Local Board, Kaipātiki Local Board, and the Birkenhead Licensing Trust.

 John Gillon - Kaipātiki Local Board
 Paula Gillon - Kaipātiki Local Board
 Adrian Tyler - Kaipātiki Local Board
Danielle Grant - Kaipātiki Local Board
Melanie Kenrick - Kaipātiki Local Board
Janet Tupou
Erica Hannam
Tim Spring

Former representatives 
 Lorene Pigg - Kaipātiki Local Board 2013-2016 (Team of Independents)
Grant Gillon -  Devonport-Takapuna Local Board (2013-2019), Kaipātiki Local Board (2013-2016)
 Jan O'Connor -  Devonport-Takapuna Local Board (2013-2019) ran on another ticket in 2019. 
 Anne-Elise Smithson - Kaipātiki Local Board (2016-2019)

Election results

2013 local body elections 
Many of those who contested the 2016 local elections for Shore Action had contested the 2013 local elections under the ticket '''Team of Independents alongside Grant and John Gillon. Shore Action holds the same values as 'Team of Independents'; Shore Action came as a re-branding of the same issues but with an increased focus on defending the natural environment. Shore Action retains a focus within the North Shore Ward, whereas Team of Independents supported a candidate beyond the North Shore for the Upper Harbour Local Board.

Of the two candidates that ran for the Devonport-Takapuna Local Board both were elected. However, only three of the four which ran for the Kaipātiki Local Board won. The only candidate to contest the Upper Harbour Local Board, did not win. Gillon did not win his council bid, and came fourth in his attempt to win one of the two seats.

The following are the 2013 local body election results for Team of Independents. 

 2016 local body elections 

 Auckland Council - North Shore ward 
Grant Gillon ran alongside Anne-Elise Smithson to contest the 2 available seats on the council. Both failed to win, however Gillon came a very close third to Richard Hills who narrowly won the seat. He received 12,523 to Hills 12,651. Smithson came in fifth on 5,967, behind Auckland Future's Danielle Grant on 6,415 and above Auckland Future's Fay Freeman on 5,308.

With neither Gillon or Smithson receiving first or second, Shore Action had no candidates elected to the Council.

 Devonport-Takapuna local board 
Gillon also ran for the Devonport-Takapuna Local Board, already serving on the board, he was re-elected with 7,640 votes, coming in third of six candidates. After the board initially sat, Gillon was elected Chair.

Jan O'Connor, a 'Team of Independents''' incumbent on the board stood for re-election and won, coming in fourth on 6,688 votes.

Of the five candidates for six seats, only Gillon and O'Connor were successful. Trish Deans, Rohan Lord, and Garry Venus were not elected.

 Kaipātiki local board 
Like Gillon in Devonport-Takapuna, Smithson ran for the Kaipātiki Local Board. She was elected coming in seventh at 7,014.

John and Paula Gillon, Grant Gillon's son and daughter, were also elected to the board receiving 10,766 and 8,921 respectively coming in third and forth. John Gillon, a 'Team of Independents candidate was elected Deputy Chair of the board, alongside Auckland Future's Danielle Grant who was elected Chair for the first 15 months, with Gillon taking over as Chair in February 2018 Paula Gillon, also ran as Shore Actions only candidate for the Birkenhead Licensing Trust, she received 5,012 coming first and won one of the six available seats.

Adrian Tyler was also elected to the board receiving 6,934 votes.

Of the six candidates for eight seats, both Sarah Nilson and Lisa Ducat were not elected.

2016 local body election results for Shore Action 

Upon winning a seat on the Devonport-Takapuna Local Board, Grant Gillon was elected Chair at the board's first meeting. John Gillon, was elected Kaipātiki Local Board Deputy Chair at the first meeting and took over as Chair in February 2018.

2019 Local Body Elections 
In 2019, Shore Action stood six candidates for the Kaipātiki Local Board: John and Paula Gillon, Anne-Elise Smithson, Adrian Tyler, and newcomer to the ticket Melanie Kenrick. Danielle Grant, who was elected under the Labour Party ticket, Kaipatiki Voice in 2013-2016, and the Auckland Future ticket in 2016, also stood for Auckland Council under the More For The Shore ticket as well as joining the Shore Action ticket for Kaipātiki Local Board.

Paula Gillon ran again for the Birkenhead Licensing Trust but under the ticket of 'Your Community Trust'.

Jan O'Connor who ran on the Shore Action ticket in 2016, and on the Team on Independents ticket in 2013 ran on the ticket 'Heart of the Shore' for the Devonport-Takapuna Local Board.

2019 local body election results for Shore Action 
All except 1 candidate, Anne-Elise Smithson, were elected.

More for the Shore 
Danielle Grant again ran for North Shore Ward Councillor alongside Grant Gillon on the ticket of 'More for the Shore'. Gillon did not run for Kaipātiki, or run on the Shore Action ticket. The two council candidates have endorsed Shore Action for the Kaipātiki Local Board creating an informal link between the two tickets.

Both Danielle Grant and Grant Gillon lost their attempt to win a seat as North Shore Ward Councillor.

References

North Shore, New Zealand
Politics of the Auckland Region
Political groupings in New Zealand